Colin White (born December 12, 1977) is a Canadian former professional ice hockey player. He previously played with the New Jersey Devils and the San Jose Sharks of the NHL.

Early life 
White was born and raised in New Glasgow, Nova Scotia.

Playing career
White played Midget hockey for the Weeks Major Midget AAA in New Glasgow, Nova Scotia, before being drafted 49th overall in the 1996 NHL Entry Draft by the New Jersey Devils.

In 1997, White won the Memorial Cup with the Hull Olympiques. During the 2000–2001 season, White put up 20 points, helping the Devils to the Stanley Cup finals.

During the 2007–2008 pre-season, White suffered a serious eye injury. During a team practice on September 19, "White was defending against two-on-one rushes when John Madden gave rookie Nicklas Bergfors the puck for a shot that deflected off White's stick and hit him in the nose and near the right eye." White was able to return to the lineup on November 21 to play in the Devils' 2–1 victory over the Pittsburgh Penguins. Despite still suffering from some blurred vision in his right eye, he was able to play over 17 minutes, blocked two shots, and was credited with six of the Devils' fifteen hits. White quickly returned to his regular spot in the Devils line-up, where he began wearing a protective visor on his helmet.

In the 2008–2009 season, White played 71 games, finishing the season with one goal, 17 assists and a +18 rating, one of his highest career offensive seasons.

On February 2, 2010, for the first time in nearly four years, White fought Maple Leafs defensemen Dion Phaneuf for taking a run at teammate Zach Parise's head. Had White been hit near his previously injured eye during the fight, his career could have been in jeopardy. The following season, White fought with Bruno Gervais of the New York Islanders. White had previously hit P. A. Parenteau, which sparked the fight that ended with White fracturing Gervais' cheekbone.

White established himself as physical, defensive defenseman, often leading the Devils in penalty minutes to go with his relatively low offensive production. During his Devils tenure, White served several times as an alternate captain.

On August 1, 2011, White was placed on waivers by the New Jersey Devils along with Trent Hunter. He was then bought out from the final year of his contract on August 2 after clearing. On August 3, White was signed by the San Jose Sharks to a one-year, $1M contract.

On May 31, 2012, it was announced that White's jersey number 24 was to be retired by his junior team the Gatineau Olympiques, formerly the Hull Olympiques. He became the fifth player to have his jersey retired, joining the likes of Luc Robitaille and Jose Theodore, on November 8, 2012.

At the conclusion of the 2012–13 NHL lockout, after White accepted an invitation to the St. Louis Blues training camp, on January 18, 2013, the Blues announced that they had released White from his professional tryout.

Post-retirement
White is an ambassador for the New Jersey Devils' alumni association along with Bruce Driver, Ken Daneyko, Grant Marshall and Jim Dowd.

Personal life
White has three children.

Career statistics

Awards and honours

References

External links

1977 births
Living people
Albany River Rats players
Canadian ice hockey defencemen
Canadian people of British descent
Hull Olympiques players
Ice hockey people from Nova Scotia
Laval Titan Collège Français players
New Jersey Devils draft picks
New Jersey Devils players
People from New Glasgow, Nova Scotia
San Jose Sharks players
Stanley Cup champions